John Manson (born 22 June 1968) is a retired Scottish international rugby union footballer who played with the Caledonia Reds and Glasgow Warriors, two of Scotland's first professional rugby teams.

Rugby Union career

Amateur career

Manson played for Hillfoots, Dundee HSFP, Stirling County, and West of Scotland FC at amateur level.

Manson, while with the Dundee side, was one of the original Tillicoultry Trogs who brought the hard edge to Dundee HSFP's pack in the club's heyday in the early nineties. Alongside front row companion Danny Herrington, Manson made sure one of Scotland's future heroes, Prop Tom Smith had a tough fight to see 1st XV action with the club. Manson was part of the historic unbeaten NZ tour of 1992, the first ever by a British club side.

Professional career

When Scottish rugby turned its district sides professional in 1996, Manson first of all played for Caledonia Reds. When the Reds district was taken over by Glasgow, Manson then played for the Glasgow side.

Manson played for Glasgow Warriors, then as Glasgow Caledonians, in friendly matches of the 1998-99 season. He played against Richmond, Māori All Blacks and Fiji.

Manson has also played against some notable touring teams including the ACT Brumbies.

International career

Manson was capped seven times for Scotland A and represented Scotland for Select and Development XV's against the touring All Blacks and Springboks in 1993 and 1994 respectively. He earned his only full Scotland cap 1995 as a replacement against England at Twickenham. Manson went on to tour South Africa with the 1995 World Cup Squad where he was a replacement in Scotlands record 89–0 win over the Ivory Coast.

Caps

Scotland full caps

 1995  (r),  (1995 Rugby World Cup)

Scotland A Caps

 1995 ITA, FRA, IRE  1996 SAA  1997 WAL(r), FRA(r), ENG

Scotland Development XV

 1994 SA

Scotland Select

1993 NZ

Managerial career

Manson was the Scottish Rugby Union's Regional Development Manager for the Central & West Lothian area and was also the assistant manager for the National U18 Squad.

In 2019 Manson was hired as Rugby Operations Manager for Old Glory DC.

Notes

1968 births
Living people
Caledonia Reds players
Dundee HSFP players
Glasgow Warriors players
Hillfoots RFC players
North and Midlands players
Rugby union players from Bridge of Allan
Scotland international rugby union players
Scottish rugby union players
Stirling County RFC players
West of Scotland FC players
Rugby union props